Keith Grennan (born May 20, 1984) is a former American football defensive end. He most recently played for the Hartford Colonials of the United Football League. He was signed by the San Diego Chargers as an undrafted free agent in 2007. He played college football at Eastern Washington.

He has also been a member of the Cleveland Browns.

Early years
Grennan graduated from Edmonds-Woodway High School in 2002.  He was a first-team All-WesCo 4A South League selection and was a Seattle Times All-Area performer. He helped block for running back Kyle Thew, who had a pair of 300-yard rushing games. He bench pressed 395 pounds on two occasions during his senior year and achieved a 4.9-second mark in the 40-yard dash.

College career
In 2006, he was Honorable Mention All-Big Sky Conference choice as senior. In 2005, he started four games at defensive tackle, including Eastern's last three games of the year.  In 2004, he lost a year of eligibility after having to sit out the 2004 season because of NCAA transfer rules. CWU: Played as a tight end in the 2003 season at Central Washington University after redshirting in 2002. He finished the 2003 season with 12 catches for 157 yards (13.1 per catch) with no touchdowns.

Professional career

San Diego Chargers
Grennan signed two-year contract with the San Diego Chargers as an undrafted free agent on May 4, 2007.

Cleveland Browns
Grennan was signed to the Cleveland Browns' practice squad prior to the 2009 offseason. He was waived on October 9, 2009, and re-signed to the practice squad on October 20.

After his contract expired following the 2009 season, Grennan was re-signed to a future contract on January 5, 2010.

UFL
Grennan signed with the United Football League Hartford Colonials for the 2011 season. He became a free agent on August 10, 2011, when the Colonials were contracted by the UFL.

References

External links

Cleveland Browns bio

1984 births
Living people
People from Edmonds, Washington
Players of American football from Washington (state)
American football tight ends
American football defensive tackles
American football defensive ends
Central Washington Wildcats football players
Eastern Washington Eagles football players
San Diego Chargers players
Cleveland Browns players
Hartford Colonials players